Beggars Bush is the site of the former Beggars Bush Barracks on Haddington Road in the inner southern suburbs of Dublin, Ireland, as well the surrounding area and a nearby pub. The barracks were bordered to the east by Shelbourne Road, which used to be the western bank of the River Dodder.  The locality is in the jurisdiction of Dublin City Council, is broadly considered to be part of Ballsbridge, and is in the postal district Dublin 4.

History
The earliest mention of the name is a 1573 reference to "the wood called Beggars boush". Neil  Howlett notes earlier instances of "Beggars Bush" as a minor placename in England, usually denoting poor-quality farmland. The idea that it denoted a meeting place for beggars or a thieves' den is rejected by Howlett as a folk etymology originating in Brewer's Dictionary of Phrase and Fable.

The site has been occupied by a  pub since 1803. It was also occupied by the Beggars Bush Barracks from 1827 until 1929 but is now the home of the Labour Relations Commission, the Geological Survey of Ireland, the Irish Labour History Society Museum and the National Print Museum.

Trivia
Beggars Bush is mentioned in the song Whiskey on a Sunday, in the versions made popular by performers including The Irish Rovers and The Dubliners.
Flogging Molly lead singer and guitarist Dave King grew up in Beggars Bush, and the band recorded a song called "The Ol' Beggars Bush" on their album Swagger. Also on the album was the song "Life in Tenement Square" which is believed to reference the area.

References

Ballsbridge
Towns and villages in Dublin (city)
Townlands of County Dublin